What? Records was a short-lived record label started by Word Records and A&M Records, intended to focus on creative and unusual rock and roll records with spiritual messages.

In the short time that the label existed, it released albums by Mark Heard (under the name of iDEoLA), Tonio K. (two albums, the second of which was produced by T-Bone Burnett), and Chagall Guevara's Dave Perkins.

Discography
 Romeo Unchained - Tonio K., 1986
 Tribal Opera - iDEoLA, 1987
 The Innocence - Dave Perkins, 1987
 Notes from the Lost Civilization - Tonio K., 1988*
 Iona - Iona, 1990

See also
 List of record labels

American record labels
Christian record labels
Record labels established in 1986
Record labels disestablished in 1988
American companies established in 1986